Laos participated in the 2005 Southeast Asian Games held in multiple venues in the Philippines from November 27, 2005, to December 5, 2005. The chief of mission to the games was Somphou Phongsa.

Participation details

2005 in Laotian sport
Nations at the 2005 Southeast Asian Games
2005